The Regional District of Nanaimo is a regional district located on the eastern coast of Vancouver Island, British Columbia, Canada. It is bordered to the south by the Cowichan Valley Regional District, to the west by the Alberni-Clayoquot Regional District, and to the northwest by the Comox Valley Regional District. Its administration offices are located in Nanaimo. During the 2016 census, its population was established at 155,698.

The Regional District of Nanaimo was incorporated on August 24, 1967. It has members that are cities, towns, districts, and seven electoral areas that contain unincorporated communities.

The region owns and operates the Nanaimo Regional Transit System, which provides conventional local bus routes and special needs paratransit services.

Incorporated municipalities

Electoral areas
Electoral areas have no administrative or governmental function, and are used only to select rural representatives to the Regional District board.

Area A (Cassidy/Cedar)
This electoral area is located on Vancouver Island, on the Stuart Channel southeast of Nanaimo.

According to the Canada 2016 Census:
Population: 7,058 (exclusive of any residents of Indian Reserves)
% Change (2011-2016): 2.2
Dwellings: 3,116
Area (km²): 60.31
Density (persons per km²): 117.0

Contains the communities of Cassidy, Cedar, and South Wellington.  Nanaimo Airport is also located here.

Area B (Gabriola Island)
This electoral area contains DeCourcy Island, Gabriola Island and Mudge Island.

According to the Canada 2016 Census:
Population: 4,033 (exclusive of any residents of Indian Reserves)
% Change (2011-2016): -0.3
Dwellings: 2,987
Area (km²): 57.76
Density (persons per km²): 69.8

Area C (Arrowsmith/Benson)
This electoral area is located on Vancouver Island, to the southwest of Nanaimo.  It contains the upper Nanaimo River, the Nanaimo Lakes, Mount Benson and Mount Arrowsmith.

According to the Canada 2016 Census:
Population: 2,808 (exclusive of any residents of Indian Reserves)
% Change (2011-2016): -0.9
Dwellings: 1,097
Area (km²): 1,098.94
Density (persons per km²): 2.6

Contains the community of Extension.

Area E (Nanoose Bay)
This electoral area is located on Vancouver Island, on the shore of the Strait of Georgia, between Lantzville and Parksville.  It is co-extensive with the community of Nanoose Bay.

According to the Canada 2016 Census:
Population: 6,125 (exclusive of any residents of Indian Reserves)
% Change (2011-2016): 7.9
Dwellings: 3,066
Area (km²): 75.08
Density (persons per km²): 81.6

Area F (Alberni Highway)
This electoral area is located on Vancouver Island, to the west of Qualicum Beach and Parksville.  British Columbia Highway 4 runs the length of the area.

According to the Canada 2016 Census:
Population: 7,724 (exclusive of any residents of First Nation Reserves)
% Change (2011-2016): 4.1
Dwellings: 3,530
Area (km²): 264.36
Density (persons per km²): 29.2

Includes the communities of Coombs, Errington, Hilliers, Meadowood and Whiskey Creek, as well as Cameron Lake and Cathedral Grove.

Area G (Mid-Oceanside)
This electoral area is located on Vancouver Island, on the shore of the Strait of Georgia, surrounding Qualicum Beach and almost surrounding Parksville.

According to the Canada 2016 Census:
Population: 7,465 (exclusive of any residents of Indian Reserves)
% Change (1996-2001): 4.3
Dwellings: 3,553
Area (km²): 49.32
Density (persons per km²): 151.4

Contains the communities of Dashwood and French Creek.

Area H (Lighthouse Country)
This electoral area is located on Vancouver Island, on the shore of the Strait of Georgia at the southern entrance to Baynes Sound, northwest of Qualicum Beach.

According to the Canada 2016 Census:
Population: 3,884 (exclusive of any residents of Indian Reserves)
% Change (1996-2001): 10.7
Dwellings: 2,436
Area (km²): 277.41
Density (persons per km²): 14.0

Contains the communities of Bowser, Deep Bay, Dunsmuir and Horne Lake, as well as the Shaw Hill area in its southeastern part.

Demographics

Note: Totals greater than 100% due to multiple origin responses.

Administrative role
The Regional District of Nanaimo categorizes its responsibilities into five "action areas":
 The Regional Federation
 Strategic and Community Development
 Transportation and Solid Waste
 Regional and Community Utilities
 Recreation and Parks

See also
List of historic places in the Nanaimo Regional District

References
Statistics Canada Community Profile: Nanaimo (regional district)

Notes

External links

 
Nanaimo
Mid Vancouver Island
Populated places established in 1967